The Choreutoscope is the first pre-cinema device which employed a system similar to early film projectors. It was the first projection device to use an intermittent movement, which became the basis of many cine cameras and projectors. It was formed by a sheet of glass on which different drawings were made, and the sheet was mounted on a type off Maltese cross mechanism, thanks to which the image would move suddenly. The most common drawing was the 'dancing skeleton' in which six sequential images of a skeleton were animated in the viewing pane.

History 
The Choreutoscope was invented by Lionel Smith Beale in 1866. Beale used it for demonstrations at the Royal Polytechnic. However, Beale was not the only one to create a Choreutoscope, a few years later William C.Huges created his own Choreutoscope in 1884, and B .Brown created a similar machine to it the year 1896.

References

External links 
Dancing skeleton (animated) from the Alexis du Pont stereoviews and lantern slides collection at Hagley Museum and Library

Precursors of film
Projectors